Pumajaw are a Scotland-based electronic duo, composed of Scottish singer-songwriter Pinkie Maclure (vocals, synths, samples, concertina) and English musician/producer John Wills (guitar, samples, synths, drum programming).

The duo met in London in 1994 when Wills produced Maclure's solo album. John Wills had previously been a founder member of Loop and The Hair and Skin Trading Company. Originally known as "Pinkie Maclure and John Wills", the duo changed their name following their move to Scotland from London in 2001.  Their music is characterised by a blend of rich, cinematic arrangements and wide-ranging, jazz-inflected vocals. They have recorded six albums together since 2000,  influenced stylistically by film soundtracks, jazz, psychedelic folk and electronica.

The duo tour Europe regularly and have performed in Russia and the USA.  Their music has been remixed by Various Productions, Crooked Man and Christ., among others.  In 2013 they recorded an album of songs from film noir to perform at the Edinburgh Festival Fringe.  This became a multimedia stage production  called Song Noir, with films by John Wills.
They have also been known as Lumen and Fingerfood.

Discography
Scapa Foolscap (2022)
Song Noir (2014)
Demonmeowmeow (2011)
Favourites (2009)
Curiosity Box (2008) 
Becoming Pumajaw (2006)
Cat's Cradle (2005)
This Day & Age (2003)
From Memorial Crossing (2000)

References

External links
Official website
Review in The Glasgow Herald
Review in The Skinny

Scottish electronic music groups
Electronica music groups
British electronic music duos